Berea is a home rule-class city in Madison County, Kentucky, in the United States. The town is best known for its art festivals, historic restaurants and buildings, and as the home to Berea College, a private liberal arts college. The population was 15,539 at the 2020 census. It is one of the fastest-growing towns in Kentucky, having increased by 27.4% since 2000. Berea is a principal city of the Richmond−Berea Micropolitan Statistical Area, which includes Madison and Rockcastle counties. It was formally incorporated by the state assembly in 1890.

Geography
The city is located along Interstate 75, which runs to the west of downtown, with access from exits 76 and 77. U.S. Route 25 is the main highway through the center of town, leading north  to Richmond, the Madison County seat, and south  to Mount Vernon. Kentucky Route 21 also runs through the city as well, leading east  to Bighill and northwest  to Paint Lick.

Berea is located on the border of the Cumberland Plateau.

Climate
Berea has a humid subtropical climate, with hot summers and relatively cold winters. Summers tend to be humid and sunny, with occasional storms, while winters are generally cold with many milder periods.

Demographics

At the 2010 census, there were 13,561 people, 5,119 households and 3,382 families residing in the city. The racial makeup of the city was 90.7% White, 4.00% African American, 0.5% Native American, 1.2 percent Asian, 0.1% Pacific Islander, 0.9% from other races, and 2.6% from two or more races. Hispanics or Latinos of any race were 2.7% of the population.

There were 5,119 households, of which 31.2% had children under the age of 18 living with them. 47.1% were married couples living together, 4.5% had a male householder with no wife present, 14.4% had a female householder with no husband present, and 33.9% were non-families. 28.9% of all households were made up of individuals, and 22.9% had someone living alone who was 65 years of age or older. The average household size was 2.39 and the average family size was 2.92.

The age distribution was 22.7% under the age of 18, 8.6% from 18 to 21, 53.2% from 21 to 62, 2.8% from 62 to 65, and 12.7% who were 65 years of age or older. The median age was 32.4 years. The population was 53.4% female and 46.6% male (81 males per 100 females).

The median household income was $38,333 and the median family income was $45,541. Males had a median income of $28,304 compared $12,163 for females. The per capita income for the city was $18,003. About 27.0% of the population were below the poverty line, including 39.6% of those under age 18 and 7.0% of those age 65 or over.

Economy

Major employers
Major employers in 2011 include
 Hitachi Astemo (auto parts)
 Kentucky Steel Center (auto parts)
 KI (USA) (auto parts)
 STEMCO Motor Wheel (auto parts)
 NACCO Materials Handling Group (forklifts)
 Novelis (metals)
 Pittsburgh Glass Works (auto parts)
 Wal-Mart
 Berea College
 City of Berea
 Madison County School System

Education
Berea has a lending library, a branch of the Madison County Public Library.

Arts and culture
Due to the high number of arts and crafts produced, Berea is a tourist attraction. It hosts several crafts festivals throughout the year. Berea also hosts a Spoonbread Festival in mid-September, which features a cornmeal bread traditionally served with a wooden spoon. The annual Berea College Celebration of Traditional Music, started in 1974, takes place in mid-October and features traditional music as passed down by people in the Appalachian region.

Transportation
Foothills Express, operated by the Kentucky River Foothills Development Council, provides the Berea Bus Service bus service within Berea, Madison County Connector service to Richmond, and local and intercity demand-responsive transport.

Notable people
 Sue Draheim, fiddler, lived in Berea in her later years until her death in 2013.
 John Gregg Fee (1816–1901), minister, abolitionist, founder of Berea College
 John Fenn, recipient of 2002 Nobel Prize in Chemistry; grew up in Berea.
 Red Foley, singer, musician, and radio and TV personality; raised in Berea and graduated from Berea High School.
 Damien Harris, college football player at the University of Alabama; graduated from Madison Southern High School, now a running back for the New England Patriots.
 bell hooks, author, radical feminist, and social activist; lived in Berea until her death.
 Silas House, writer and novelist lives in Berea.
 Louise Gilman Hutchins (1911–1996), pediatrician and president of Berea's Mountain Maternal Health League.
 Ashley Judd, actress, humanitarian and political activist; briefly lived and attended school in Berea
 Naomi Judd, country music singer; briefly lived in Berea.
 Wynonna Judd, country music singer; briefly lived and attended school in Berea.
 Lily May Ledford, banjo player, member of the Coon Creek Girls; lived in Berea and is buried in the Berea cemetery.
 J.P. Pennington, musician, son of Lily May Ledford; born in Berea.
 Jean Ritchie, musician, "Mother of Folk"; resided in Berea until her death in 2015.
 Tony Snow, former White House press secretary; born in Berea.
 Luke Stocker, NFL player, tight end, Tampa Bay Buccaneers; graduated from Madison Southern High School.

See also 

 Bobtown, Kentucky, a nearby hamlet

References

External links

Cities in Kentucky
Cities in Madison County, Kentucky
Richmond–Berea micropolitan area